Hoffmanobolidae is a family of millipedes belonging to the order Spirobolida.

Genera:
 Hoffmanobolus Shelley, 2001

References

Spirobolida